Rehmannia glutinosa is one of the 50 fundamental herbs used in traditional Chinese medicine, where it has the name shēng dì huáng. It is often sold as gān dì huáng, gān meaning "dried".

Chemical constituents
A number of chemical constituents including iridoids, phenethyl alcohol, glycosides, cyclopentanoid monoterpenes, and norcarotenoids, have been reported from the fresh or processed roots of R. glutinosa.

Etymology
 Rehmannia is named for Joseph Rehmann (1788–1831), a physician in St. Petersburg.
 Glutinosa means 'glutinous', 'sticky', or 'viscous'.

See also
Chinese herbology – 50 fundamental herbs

References

glutinosa
Plants used in traditional Chinese medicine
Medicinal plants